Waterbodies were a Garage rock band from St. Catharines, Ontario, Canada.  They performed around Ontario and released three EPs, an album and one single.

History
Singer and guitarist Mike McGean and Shane Turner formed as a recording project with bass player Josh Korody in 2008. The band released an EP, Sleep Like Submarines in 2009, which was produced by Korody.  Shortly after that Korody left the band; and guitarist Dylan Turner joined. They released another EP, Floresta, which, after some work by another producer, was brought back to Korody for adjustments and mastering. The band had several bass players during the next few years.   After one more EP, they released a full album, The Evil We Know.

In 2012 Waterbodies performed in Toronto at the El Mocombo as part of Canada Music Week. In 2013 they released their album The Evil We Know. Soon after, Dylan Turner left the band.

In 2014 Waterbodies played at the Soil Arts Festival.

Current members
Mike McGean (Guitar, Vocals)
Roxy (Bass, Vocals)
Shane Turner (Drums)

Past members
John Neadow (Bass)
Samy (Bass)
Justin Jennings (Bass)
Dylan Turner (Guitar, Keyboard, Vocals)
Josh Korody (Bass)

Discography
 Sleep Like Submarines, 2009
 Floresta, 2010
 Black Braille, 2011
 The Evil We Know (12"), 2013
 What the French Call 'Les Incompétents' (Single), 2014

References

External links
Official Site
Waterbodies on Bandcamp
Official Site

Canadian indie rock groups
Musical groups from St. Catharines
Musical groups established in 2008
Musical groups disestablished in 2015
2008 establishments in Ontario
2015 disestablishments in Ontario